Pennsylvania Railroad Passenger Station may refer to:
 Pennsylvania Railroad Passenger Station (California, Pennsylvania) or California Area Public Library
 Pennsylvania Railroad Passenger Station (Warren County, Pennsylvania)

See also
 Pennsylvania Station (disambiguation)